Sardab Khaneh Posht (also Romanized as Sardāb Khāneh Posht; also known as Sardākhānehposht) is a village in Kuhestani-ye Talesh Rural District, in the Central District of Talesh County, Gilan Province, Iran.

Demographics 
At the 2006 census, its population was 96, in 18 families.

References 

Populated places in Talesh County